HMS Blackpool was a  or Type 12 anti-submarine frigate of the Royal Navy.

Service history
Blackpool was leader of the 6th Frigate Squadron between 1958 and 1960 and was commanded by Edward Ashmore. 
Between 1962 and 1964 she was part of the 25th Escort squadron consisting of HMS Rothesay (Capt Place VC) (Capt D), HMS Cavendish, HMS Brighton, HMS Blackpool and HMS Llandaff (Canteen boat). Twelve months east of Suez, six months at home, and another six months in the Far East.
Between 1964 and 1966 she was leader of the 28th Escort Squadron.

She was leased to the Royal New Zealand Navy between 7 June 1966 and 30 June 1971. In 1969, Blackpool was present at the Melbourne-Evans collision.

See also
 Frigates of the Royal New Zealand Navy

References

Sources
 
 Gerry Wright, The Story of HMNZS Blackpool (Wellington: Printshop, 2012).

Ships built in Belfast
Whitby-class frigates
Whitby-class frigates of the Royal New Zealand Navy
1957 ships
Ships built by Harland and Wolff